Emem Inwang  is a Nigerian actress and model. She was formerly Emem Udonquak. On October 18, 2014 she won the 2014 Nollywood Movies Awards (3rd edition) for Best Actress in a Supporting Role in the movie Itoro. The event was held at the Intercontinental Hotel, Lagos.

Biography
Emen Inwang is a Nigerian actress and model from Awka Ibom state. She celebrates her birthday on September 8. On April 5, 2014 Emem married Moses Inwang, a Nigerian movie director and producer. They had their first child in 2015.

Career
Emem is a model and became prominent when she was crowned the 2011/2012 Calabar Carnival Queen on Friday December 23, 2011. The Pageant was sponsored by First Bank of Nigeria. In the same year, she signed an ambassadorial deal and was officially the Calabar’s Tourism Ambassador and spokesperson for Mothers Against Child Abandonment (An initiative of the Wife of the former Governor of Cross River State, Obioma Liyel-Imoke). However, she delved into acting and has featured in several Nollywood movies.

Selected filmography
 Dr. Love (2020)
Itoro (2013)
Lock Down (2021)
Unroyal (2020)
Alter Ego (2017)
Crazy People (2018)

Accolades

External links

References

Actresses from Akwa Ibom State
Living people
21st-century Nigerian actresses
University of Uyo alumni
Year of birth missing (living people)
Nigerian film actresses
Nigerian female models
Nigerian film award winners